Ectoedemia picturata is a moth of the family Nepticulidae. It was described by Puplesis in 1985. It is known from the Russian Far East.

The larvae feed on Rosa davurica and Rosa rugosa.

References

Nepticulidae
Moths of Asia
Moths described in 1985